Rodney Dwayne Culver (December 23, 1969May 11, 1996) was an American football running back who played in the National Football League (NFL) for four seasons. During this time, he played for the Indianapolis Colts and San Diego Chargers. Over the course of his career, he played in 43 games, rushed for 689 yards on 241 carries, and ran for 12 touchdowns.

High school and college
Culver attended St. Martin de Porres High School in Detroit, Michigan and earned a scholarship to the University of Notre Dame where he started as a tailback in 1990 and 1991. The Irish backfield had a number of talented running backs including future pros Ricky Watters and Reggie Brooks, and NFL Hall-of-Famer Jerome Bettis. Culver played as a freshman on the 1988 national championship team, including a touchdown run in the 1989 Fiesta Bowl against West Virginia.  He led the Irish in rushing in 1990 with 710 yards in 11 games. The Irish were ranked number one twice that year and eventually lost  to the University of Colorado in the 1991 Orange Bowl. The following year, Culver was injured but played spectacularly in Notre Dame's 39-28 defeat of the University of Florida Gators. The performance propelled him to a professional career.

For the 1991 season, he had the rare honor of serving as the team’s only captain, the first time that occurred since 1986. He graduated with a degree in finance in three-and-a-half years.

Professional football career
Culver was drafted by the Indianapolis Colts in the fourth round of the 1992 NFL Draft. He was a short-yardage back his first year, carrying the ball 121 times for 321 yards and seven touchdowns. He also caught 26 passes for 210 yards and two more touchdowns. The Colts finished 9–7 but missed the AFC playoffs by one game. In 1993, the Colts were expected to contend but a holdout by Jeff George and an injury to Steve Emtman plunged the Colts to last. Culver ran for three touchdowns and caught one more. He was cut at the end of the season and claimed off waivers by the San Diego Chargers just before the start of the 1994 season.

Culver was the last man in a talented San Diego backfield that included newcomer Natrone Means, and halfbacks Eric Bieniemy and Ronnie Harmon. Culver, in fact, only carried the ball eight times all year, but he averaged over seven yards per carry. In the 1994–95 divisional playoff versus Miami, Culver carried six times for fourteen yards as the Chargers beat the Miami Dolphins, 22–21. Culver had no carries or catches in the 1994–95 AFC Championship Game against the Pittsburgh Steelers, a game won by the Chargers, 17–13. Culver made an appearance in Super Bowl XXIX against the San Francisco 49ers, but he failed to touch the ball. The Chargers lost, 49–26.

In his final season, 1995, Culver got more carries because of a holdout and later injury to Natrone Means. He carried the ball forty-seven times for 155 yards and three touchdowns and caught five passes for twenty-one yards. The Chargers made it back to the playoffs but lost to Culver's former team, the Colts, 35–20.

Culver scored the tying touchdown in the infamous Chargers-Giants "Snowball Game" at the Meadowlands in 1995.  It was his last TD.

Death
Culver and his wife Karen were killed in the crash of ValuJet Flight 592 on May 11, 1996. The Culvers are survived by their two daughters, at the time of the crash ages 2 (Briana) and 14 months (Jada). A settlement was reached with the airline ValuJet, which paid Culver's family $28 million.

References

External links
Rodney Culver at JT-SW

1969 births
1996 deaths
Players of American football from Detroit
American football running backs
Notre Dame Fighting Irish football players
Indianapolis Colts players
San Diego Chargers players
Victims of aviation accidents or incidents in the United States
Victims of aviation accidents or incidents in 1996
Accidental deaths in Florida
Saint Martin de Porres High School (Detroit) alumni